Kargopol is the name of several inhabited localities in Russia.

Urban localities
Kargopol, a town in Kargopolsky District of Arkhangelsk Oblast

Rural localities
Kargopol, Republic of Tatarstan, a selo in Alkeyevsky District of the Republic of Tatarstan